Beaulieu-sur-Dordogne (literally Beaulieu on Dordogne) is a commune in the Corrèze department in the Nouvelle-Aquitaine region, central France. Beaulieu is a medieval city, originally dominated by its great abbey of St Pierre, of which only the abbey church remains. On 1 January 2019, the former commune Brivezac was merged into Beaulieu-sur-Dordogne.

Geography

Toponymy
Beaulieu comes from the Latin "bellus locus", "lieu beau", a nice place to live. The inhabitants of Beaulieu are called by varies names: Beaulieusard, Beaulieurois, Bellilocien, Bellieurain, Bellilocois, Belliloquois, Belliloqueteux, Belliquière, Berlugan, Beloudonien.

Location
Beaulieu is in the south of the Corrèze department. It is located on the D940 road on the banks of the Dordogne river, south of the Limousin. Tulle is 37 km north. Brive-la-Gaillarde is 38 km away and Collonges-la-Rouge is 20 km to the northwest. Aurillac (Cantal) is 60 km to the east.

Hydrography and relief
The commune is limited on its entire eastern border by the Dordogne, and watered to the north by its tributary the Ménoire.

History

Middle ages

In the midst of the War of succession at the head of Aquitaine, around 855, Rodolphe de Turenne, Archbishop of Bourges, rallied to the legitimate cause embodied by Charles the Bald, was committed to establishing a monastic foundation on his family lands. After a vain attempt at Végennes, he turned to Vellinus. The cartulary of the abbey reported that at the sight of the place's splendour, he could not help but baptise it "bellus locus". From the great Solignac Abbey, he invited a team of monks to set up a new monastery and participated with his wide kin in the building of the abbey's heritage. The monastery was consecrated in 860. Like those at nearby Uzerche and Limoges, the abbey of Saint Pierre at Beaulieu was a Benedictine foundation and flourished largely because of its proximity to the Way of St. James. The first monks came from the abbey of Solignac, near Limoges.

Thanks to the pious donations of the Counts of Quercy, the Viscounts of Turenne, their multiple vassals, the area of the abbey consists of a third of the Bas-Limousin. Endowed with a treasure trove of relics (Saint-Prime and Félicien), and although it suffered from secular lusts, it had a spectacular rise that allowed the development of pilgrimages. Beaulieu became an essential stage on the roads uniting Limoges to Aurillac and Figeac, leading to Conques, Moissac, Toulouse and Compostela. As its wealth grew, the independence of the abbey was threatened by neighbouring feudal lords and it was defended against their depredations by the bishops of Limoges. Annexed to the Cluny Abbey around 1095, it was reformed and experienced a favourable period and the construction of the great abbey church was begun and it continued for nearly half a century. In the fourteenth century, a separate western steeple was erected: this also acted as the town's belfry.

The powerful abbey, under the protection of popular saints, was located around fertile lands, an indispensable condition for the village inhabitants to develop. From the end of the 12th century, a village was built around the conventual buildings protected by a wall, punctuated by towers and bordered by a ditch. From the monastic enclosure, districts developed outside the walls: the Faubourg de la Grave, towards the Dordogne, where the former hospital was located; the main district at the site of the old village of Vellinus; the Barri du Trou in which the deceased were buried and the Mirabel district near the ancient orchards of the abbey. Beaulieu became an important commercial place from which emerged a true bourgeois community that aroused the desires of the Lords of Castelnau and Turenne.

From 1213, saw the end of the Cluny stranglehold, with the abbey losing power little by little. Beaulieu became the seat of the conflicts for power between the Lord Abbot, the middle-class and the Viscount of Turenne. With the beginning of the fifteenth century, the abbey gradually crumbled.

Modern era

The abbey declined during the Hundred Years' War, which devastated the region. The French Wars of Religion completed the process. The abbey suffered the attacks by the Protestants during that war. As the sixteenth century approached, the ideas of the reform had spread under the influence of the merchants and gabariers (barge-men) of the Dordogne. Twice (1569–1574), the Protestants troops of the Admiral Gaspard de Coligny plundered the city and the abbey. The abbey church was then transformed into a Protestant temple. Given to the Catholic cult, in 1622, thanks to the Catholic League, the abbey was rebuilt in the seventeenth century by the Benedictine Congregation of Saint-Maur. They reinstate the monastic discipline and it was not until 1663 that the abbey began to function again. The city, again prosperous, erected its opulent mansions. The former Leaguer's created, with the help of the bishops, many brotherhoods.

French Revolution and Empire
The abbey still sheltered six monks when the revolution destroyed the conventual buildings and the Maurist constructions. The abbey was spared and became a parish church.

Contemporary period
On January 1, 2019, the municipality extended its perimeter to that of Brivezac.

Population and society

Population

Sport
Beaulieu's rugby club was created in 1908: Union Sportive Beaulieu (U.S.B.). A regular champion of the Limousin, the club participated in several stages of the French championship reaching the semifinals in 1921. During the 2011-2012 season, the club was shown by winning the title of Champion of France in 2nd Series by beating in the final, US Josbaig Saint Goin (15 to 11), crowning a great season and allowing the club to climb in 1st Series for the season 2012-2013.

Economy
The Beaulieu region produces 400 tonnes of strawberries or nearly 1% of French production. In particular, it feeds the production of jams by the Andros group in its factories in Biars-Bretenoux. A strawberry festival is held on the second Sunday in May, where a strawberry pie is made of 8 metres diameter and 900 kg of strawberries.

Local culture and heritage

Civil buildings

Château d'Estresse
The Chateau was built on a terrace supported by a medieval retaining wall on the Dordogne river, so as to defend Beaulieu and the upper valley from  invasions from the river (King Odo of France stopped the Normans in 889). The Chateau consists of buildings from the 14th, 15th and 16th centuries, and one can still see a bretèche protruding over the entrance gate. The Chateau approached the twentieth century in the state of ruin, but it was restored. It is included in the inventory of historical monuments.

Religious buildings

Abbey Church of St Pierre
Founded in the 9th century by Rodolphe of the family of the Counts of Turenne, Lords of Beaulieu, the abbey was attached to Cluny in the 11th century. Under the impetus of the Gregorian reforms, the pilgrimages flourished, necessitating the construction of new, better-adapted churches.

In 1150, the choir and transept of the new Church of Beaulieu were already completed. The construction would continue until the 13th century. The plan was similar to the others Romanesque churches of the pilgrimages, with a Latin Cross, having a nave with aisles and an ambulatory allowing pilgrims, to pray to the saints of their choice in the apsidal chapel without disturbing high altar. The architect Anatole de Baudot carried out restoration work.

The church has a nave of four spans. The choir, the southern arm of the transept and much of the nave date back to the original Romanesque phase of the building. The belfry and the central tower are of later, Gothic construction. The total length of the building is 71 metres, and the width at the transept is 38 metres. The nave rises to 17 metres, while the central tower exceeds it by 6 metres.

The most notable feature of the church is the elaborately sculpted south portal, particularly the tympanum. Instead of the usual Last Judgement, this depicts the Second Coming, the triumphant return of Christ, and the General Resurrection. A 2.1 metre Christ, his arms spread in the form of a cross, is flanked by the 12 Apostles, while angels above him carry the crown and nails. Meanwhile, other angels sound the trumpet to summon up the dead.

Another notable feature is a fine baroque retable in gilded wood, dating from 1678, shortly after the refounding of the abbey. It depicts the Assumption of the Virgin. The treasury contains a number of important high medieval items, including a Virgin and Child and two arm reliquaries, all made of wood and covered in silver or gold leaf.

Cultural heritage
In its 2017 charts, le Conseil national des villes et villages fleuris de France (National Council of the Flower Towns and Villages of France) awarded a flower to the commune in the Concours des villes et villages fleuris (Contest of the Flowers towns and villages).

Personalities
Notable personalities linked to the commune include:
 Eustorg de Beaulieu (1495–1552), French poet, composer and pastor
 Jean-Antoine Marbot (1754–1800), French general and politician, father of generals Adolphe and Marcellin Marbot
 Adolphe Marbot (1781–1844), French general
 Marcellin Marbot (1782–1854), French general, author of the famous Memoirs of General Marbot
 Frits Thaulow (1847–1906), Norwegian Impressionist painter
 Asher Peres (1934–2005), Israeli physicist

Gallery

See also
Communes of the Corrèze department

References

External links

 Official Web Site

Communes of Corrèze
Corrèze communes articles needing translation from French Wikipedia